The Blanchard House, also known as the Blanchard Residence, is a Ward Wellington Ward-designed home built in 1914 in Syracuse, New York, United States.  It was listed on the National Register of Historic Places in 1997.  An arbor in the back yard and a garage at the rear of the property were both also designed by Ward.

References

Houses in Syracuse, New York
National Register of Historic Places in Syracuse, New York
Houses on the National Register of Historic Places in New York (state)
Houses completed in 1914